The LNB Pro B Leaders Cup is a professional national basketball cup competition that is played in a given LNB Pro B (French 2nd Division) season. The trophy is the second tier level of its type in France, being one tier blow the LNB Pro A Leaders Cup, in which teams from the LNB Pro A (French 1st Division) compete. The Pro B Leaders Cup was introduced in 2015, in order to give Pro B teams more to play for in a given season.

Format
In the first phase of the competition, all 18 Pro B teams are divided into groups of three teams. After that, teams play in a knock-out system, with double legs in the quarterfinals and semifinals. The final is played at a neutral venue.

Results

Finals

Titles by team 

 
Recurring sporting events established in 2015
2015 establishments in France
France, 2
Basketball league cup competitions in Europe